Straight pride is a slogan that arose in the 1980s and early 1990s that has primarily been used by social conservatives as a political stance and strategy. The term is described as a response to gay pride adopted by various groups (later united under the moniker LGBT) in the early 1970s, or to the accommodations provided to gay pride initiative.

Straight pride backlash incidents have generated controversy and media attention. School policies and court decisions regarding freedom of expression have drawn particular attention, spotlighting individuals protesting school expressions against harassment of LGBTQ adolescents.

Background

Stonewall riots spark gay pride 

LGBTQ history traces back to ancient civilizations, but the term gay pride is usually associated with the modern LGBTQ rights movement that was sparked by the 1969 Stonewall riots in New York City. Newspaper coverage of the events was minor, since, in the 1960s, huge marches and mass rioting had become commonplace and the Stonewall riots were relatively small. It was the commemorative march one year later that drew 5,000 marchers up New York City's Sixth Avenue, that got nationwide publicity and led to modern-day LGBTQ pride marches. A new period of liberalism in the late 1960s began a new era of more social acceptance for homosexuality which lasted until the late 1970s. In the 1970s, the popularity of disco music and its culture in many ways made society more accepting of gays and lesbians.

Late in 1979, a new religious revival among conservative Catholics and evangelical Protestants ushered in the conservatism politically aligned with the Christian right that would reign in the United States during the 1980s, becoming another obstacle for the progress of the LGBTQ rights movement. During the HIV/AIDS epidemic of the 1980s, LGBTQ communities were further stigmatized as they became the focus of mass hysteria, suffered isolation and marginalization, and were targeted with extreme acts of violence.

Straight pride as an appeal to ridicule 

The concept of LGBTQ pride originates as a movement which seeks to challenge the negative images of LGBTQ people by being openly identified with a culturally stigmatized group; as such, it creates a discomfort.

In this context, the terms straight pride and heterosexual pride have been used as an argument criticizing gay pride as unnecessary, stating by contrast with heterosexuality that heterosexuals "don't talk about straight pride", don't have "straight pride rallies", and would be seen as ridiculous if they were to "band together and have a heterosexual pride [...] parade".

This appeal to ridicule argument expresses the idea that showing pride for LGBTQ orientations is equally absurd. Analysts of LGBTQ rights state as a counter-argument that mainstream culture offers many approved social venues (weddings, baptism, family reunions and so on) for heterosexuals to express and celebrate their sexual orientation in public, while LGBTQ individuals feel more isolated and pride parades offer them support and an opportunity for socializing.

Straight pride events 
Heterosexual pride parades exist as a response to societal acceptance of LGBTQ visibility, and originated in campuses in the 1990s as a backlash tactic.

Incidents where the slogan or concept of "Straight pride" caused controversy have occurred since the late 1980s. In 1988, Vermont Republican John Burger asked the state's Governor to establish a "Straight Pride Day". In 1990, rallies in support of Straight Pride were held at the University of Massachusetts Amherst (UMass Amherst) organized by the group Young Americans for Freedom; and at nearby Mount Holyoke College. The UMass event was promoted as "Burn a Fag in Effigy" rally. Conservative organizations at UMass Amherst held another such event the next year, attended by about fifty people and protested by a crowd estimated to be ten times larger.

"Straight pride parades" or "straight pride days" have been organized in response to similar events organized by LGBTQ groups.  Other events, typically occurring in United States high schools where First Amendment concerns arise, have revolved around people desiring to wear "straight pride" t-shirts.

At a 2010 Tea Party Express rally in Lansing, the state capital of Michigan, a vendor was selling t-shirts printed with the slogan "straight pride". Some state and national gay advocacy groups denounced the shirts, claiming that they echoed the use by racist groups of a "white pride" slogan. Some of the opposition arose from reports that the shirt seller was a sponsor of the event with a cut of sales funding the Tea Party Express, although those reports may not have been accurate.

Support for straight pride events is often based on religious objections to homosexuality. Groups such as the White Aryan Resistance and Ku Klux Klan have also tried to oppose "gay pride" by stressing straight pride.

Individual events

Yellowknife, Northwest Territories, Canada (2005)
In May 2005, the northern Canadian city of Yellowknife announced that it would mark both a gay and straight pride day.  After the mayor proclaimed June 10, 2005, as Gay Pride Day, Councillor Alan Woytuik proposed that there be a Heterosexual Day.  The mayor agreed and set it for June 9.  Woytuik defended the proposal for Heterosexual Day by stating that "recognizing the contributions of heterosexuals is just as legitimate as recognizing the contributions of gay and lesbian communities."  The group seeking the Gay Pride Day designation was dismayed, asking if Black History Month would be partnered with White Heritage Month and whether days marking heart disease and strokes should be paired with days celebrating good health.  Woytuik's request for Heterosexual Day was widely reported on.  Shocked by the attention, he withdrew his request for the proclamation and apologized.  He referred to his request as a simple one seeking to treat everyone the same which was blown out of proportion.  The city subsequently rescinded its proclamation of Heterosexual Day.

Budapest, Hungary (2010)
In 2010, a heterosexual pride march was held in Budapest.  Following the route of an earlier gay pride parade, one hundred people participated including two politicians.  The march's stated goal was to prevent future use of public spaces by homosexuals for gatherings.

São Paulo, Brazil (2011)
Debate in Brazil over this decision was intense. Evangelical supporter Carlos Apolinário, who previously tried to ban São Paulo Gay Pride Parade, told reporters that his idea was "not anti-gay, but a protest against the privileges the gay community enjoys". The Brazilian Lesbian, Gay, Bisexual, and Transgender Association criticized this claim, arguing "it could provoke homophobic violence."

Chipman, New Brunswick, Canada (2018)

In October 2018, Chipman, New Brunswick resident Glenn Bishop put up a straight pride flag, which was taken down a short while later by LGBTQ people.  Hoisting the straight flag was likened to "putting up a swastika" by local Margaret Clark.  The flag drew further protests.

San Francisco Bay Area, California, United States (2019)
Don Grundmann, a Bay Area chiropractor, founded the National Straight Pride Coalition (NSPC) in Spring of 2019 for "protecting traditional gender roles, Christianity, heterosexuality, Western Civilization, babies, and the contributions of whites to Western Civilization from the malevolence of the homosexual movement." Grundmann had previously founded Citizens Against Perversion and American Warrior Ministry. The NSPC's first event was planned to be at Modesto, California's Mancini Bowl, the Graceada Park amphitheater, but the permit was denied for safety and compatibility issues, and because their insurance was voided. After failing again to get the needed insurance for a public venue because of the nature of their event, they moved the rally to a private space but were shut down by the owners when they were alerted the event was live streaming and more counter-protesters would likely arrive. The owners were unaware of the nature of the event or group and have disavowed their involvement. After the rally was kicked out of the private venue, they moved to the parking lot of the area's Planned Parenthood, which was closed. "Grundmann had predicted some 500 attendees, but reports put the number closer to 20." Counter-protestors outnumbered participants ten-to-one.

Boston, Massachusetts, United States (2019)

The group Super Happy Fun America (SHFA) organized an August 31 "Straight Pride Parade" that attracted several hundred participants and thousands of protesters. Counter-protesters vastly outnumbered attendees of the parade. SHFA called the event "a response to the 'identity politics' of the left." Emerson College's president M. Lee Pelton warned about the event, as the parade route, starting at Copley Square and ending at Boston City Hall, borders the college campus. He said the event represents "fear and ignorance, humanity's most potent cocktail, masquerading as freedom of speech" in response to which SHFA organizer Samson Racioppi asked for a retraction and apology. The SHFA group was created in 2017 by Kyle Chapman, who founded the group Fraternal Order of the Alt-Knights a week after the Charlottesville Unite the Right riot. Staff include president John Hugo, former Republican Congressional candidate; and vice president Mark Sahady, "a member of the right-wing group Resist Marxism, who has organized several right-wing demonstrations in the past." SHFA announced the event in June 2019. Racioppi, Sahady, and Hugo contacted the police in early July 2019 when envelopes filled with glitter were mailed to them. One of the event's attendees, Marky Hutt, previously founded a group for gay Trump supporters; he said the organizers of the Straight Pride event had invited him to attend, and he was present at the event with his same-gender fiancé. 
 Thirty-four counter-protesters were arrested at the event. Boston city councilor Michelle Wu suggested that police tactics and choice of equipment raised tensions between police and counter-protesters.

High school shirt incidents

In 2001, Woodbury High School in Woodbury, Minnesota, a suburb of Saint Paul, Minnesota, created homophobia-free areas called "safe zones" designated by an inverted pink triangle and intended for gay students.  Student Elliot Chambers reacted by wearing a makeshift sweatshirt with the slogan "Straight Pride" and the image of male and female stick figures holding hands. In light of previous anti-gay incidents, the school's principal ordered Chambers to remove the shirt, and a court case ensued.  A court upheld Chambers' complaint that his First Amendment rights had been violated, and that the principal's decision was unjustified.  Although praising the principal's intentions, the judge explained that views of both sides of the debate should be allowed and that such issues should be resolved within the school's community, not within the court system.  Under the Tinker case, the court stated that the substantial disruptions claimed by the school must be shown to have some connection to Chambers' sweatshirt message of "Straight Pride".

In 2010, in response to suicides amongst gay adolescents, an Ally Week was held at St. Charles North High School in St. Charles, Illinois. On the first day of this Ally Week, though, three students arrived wearing "Straight Pride" t-shirts.  The back of these t-shirts displayed "Leviticus 20:13", a verse stating that men who perform homosexual acts should be put to death.  While the school did not force the students to remove their t-shirts, it did persuade them to remove the Bible quotation.  The following day two different students arrived wearing "Straight Pride" t-shirts minus the Bible quotations and were consequently asked to remove their shirts.

Balancing freedom of expression vs. protection of students
In school environments, straight pride expressions and events have been reviewed within a framework of balancing freedom of expression with protection of other students. In some situations, schools take actions against students who are open about or encourage hiding homosexuality, or limit clothing that has references to sexual orientation.  Such may prompt lawsuits. In the Minnesota Chambers v. Babbitt case, "The court noted that maintaining a school community of tolerance includes tolerance of such viewpoints as expressed by 'Straight Pride' as well as tolerance of homosexuality."  Conversely, it is advocated that students (including openly gay students) who are valued and respected are "more likely to learn and achieve than students who are not", requiring a balance in the school's approach to straight pride expressions.

See also

 Attraction to transgender people
 Heteronormativity
 Heterosexism
 Homophobia
 Gay agenda, disparaging term used by opponents of gay rights activism
 Gay Shame, a reaction against the mercantilism and depoliticization of gay pride
 Gender and sexual diversity
 LGBT rights opposition
 LGBT youth vulnerability
 Religion and LGBT people
 Homosexuality and religion
 LGBT-affirming religious groups
 Transgender people and religion
 Same-sex union legislation
 Legal status of same-sex marriage
 Sexuality and gender identity-based cultures
 Super straight, a controversial social media trend that was described as transphobic

References

External links

Alt-right
Anti-LGBT sentiment
Articles containing video clips
Far-right politics
Heterosexuality
Homophobia
Identity politics
LGBT pride
Social conservatism